The Little Sturgeon River is a  river in Cheboygan County, Michigan, in the United States. It is a tributary of the Indian River, part of the Mullett Lake/Cheboygan River system flowing to Lake Huron.

The Little Sturgeon rises at the outlet of Corey Lake east of Wolverine.  It flows north and joins the Indian River at the town of Indian River, east of the outlet of Burt Lake.

See also
List of rivers of Michigan

References

Michigan  Streamflow Data from the USGS

Rivers of Michigan
Rivers of Cheboygan County, Michigan
Tributaries of Lake Huron